Solute carrier family 35 member C2 is a protein that in humans is encoded by the SLC35C2 gene.

Oxygenation levels play an important role in the regulation of cellular invasiveness which occurs during early implantation when the trophoblast cells invade the uterus as well as during tumour progression and metastasis. This gene, which is regulated by oxygen tension, is induced in hypoxic trophoblast cells and is overexpressed in ovarian cancer. Two protein isoforms are encoded by transcript variants of this gene.

References

Further reading

Solute carrier family